Charles Howard Edwards (1856 – 20 March 1924) was a New Zealand cricketer who played two matches of first-class cricket for Hawke's Bay in 1884 and 1888.

On his first-class debut in 1884-85 Edwards opened the bowling for Hawke's Bay and took 4 for 17 and 3 for 20 in Hawke's Bay's eight-wicket victory over Wellington. In a one-day match against the touring Australians in 1886-87 he took 6 for 39.

Edwards was appointed manager of the Napier Gas Company in 1886, and still held that position at the time of his sudden death in 1924.

References

External links

 Charles Edwards at CricketArchive

1856 births
1924 deaths
Cricketers from Melbourne
New Zealand cricketers
Hawke's Bay cricketers
New Zealand businesspeople
Australian emigrants to New Zealand